Jake Pemberton (born January 12, 1996) is an American-Israeli professional basketball player for Maccabi Ra'anana of the Israeli National League. He played college basketball for the University of Denver.

Early life and college career
Pemberton's hometown is Highlands Ranch, Colorado, and he attended Mountain Vista High School in Highlands Ranch, Colorado, where he was named first team All-State as a senior. He led Mountain Vista H.S. to the Final Four in the Colorado State Tournament in 2014. Pemberton was named First Team All-Conference in 2014.

Pemberton played four years for the University of Denver's Pioneers under head coaches Joe Scott and Rodney Billups. On January 25, 2017, Pemberton recorded a college career-high 25 points, shooting 5-of-7 from three-point range, along with five rebounds and four assists in a 91–82 win over South Dakota State.

In his senior year at Denver, Pemberton averaged 11.1 points, 3.3 rebounds, 2.8 assists, shooting 45.2 percent from three-point range - good for second in the entire Summit League. He was named Summit Academic All-League selection.

Professional career
On July 16, 2018, Pemberton started his professional career with Maccabi Ashdod of the Israeli Premier League, signing a one-year deal. On February 17, 2019, Pemberton recorded a career-high 24 points, shooting 6-of-8 from three-point range, along with four rebounds, two assists and three steals in a 93–74 win over Ironi Nahariya. He was subsequently named Israeli League Round 18 MVP.

On August 3, 2019, Pemberton signed a one-year deal with Hapoel Haifa of the Israeli National League. He appeared in nine games for Haifa, averaging 3 points in 12.2 minutes per game. On January 29, 2020, Pemberton parted ways with Haifa to join Maccabi Ra'anana for the rest of the season.

References

External links
 Denver bio
 RealGM profile

1996 births
Living people
American expatriate basketball people in Israel
American men's basketball players
Basketball players from Colorado
Denver Pioneers men's basketball players
Hapoel Haifa B.C. players
Israeli American
Maccabi Ashdod B.C. players
Maccabi Ra'anana players
People from Highlands Ranch, Colorado
Shooting guards
Sportspeople from the Denver metropolitan area